Mueang Samut Sakhon is the capital district (amphoe mueang) of Samut Sakhon province, central Thailand.

History
Mueang Tha Chin dates back to the  Ayutthaya Kingdom.  The city was managed by the Defence ministry. King Maha Chakkraphat ordered Mueang Sakhon Buri to be established. King Mongkut (Rama IV) changed the city name to Samut Sakhon. In 1897 Mueang Samut Sakhon a district.

Locals still refer to Mueang Samut Sakhon District by its old name, Mahachai.

In addition to being called Mahachai, Samut Sakhon also has another name in Teochew dialect, Lang-Ka-Su (pinyin: Lóng zǐ cuò), literally means 'home of dragon descendants'. The name mentioned in Chinese historical records for more than 1,000 years. Therefore, it is assumed that Mueang Samut Sakhon was home to the Chinese (included Thai of Chinese descent) for a long time, because the location in this area is directly at the Tha Chin River mouth. Therefore, it is especially suitable for maritime trade. Until now, Lang-Ka-Su is still another informal name refers Mueang Samut Sakhon.

In September 2013, the wreck of an ancient Arab ship was excavated at a shrimp farm in Phanthai Norasing Subdistrict, Mueang Samut Sakhon District. Hence it was named "Phanom-Surin Ship" after the couple who own the shrimp farm. It is considered the oldest shipwreck archaeological site in Thailand and Southeast Asia.

This ship is a merchant ship dating back to the 9th century, corresponds to the Dvaravati period. This is a good piece of evidence indicates that Tha Chin River is the route that the Dvaravati Kingdom used to connect with the outside world.

Geography
Neighbouring districts are (from the west clockwise): Mueang Samut Songkhram of Samut Songkhram Province; Ban Phaeo and Krathum Baen of Samut Sakhon Province; and Bang Bon and Bang Khun Thian of Bangkok. To the south is the Bay of Bangkok.

Environment
Samut Sakhon Province has more than 6,000 small- and medium-sized factories, many of them in this district. Soil and water samples from the industrial area of Mueang District were found to be contaminated with high levels of arsenic, lead, cadmium, chromium, zinc, copper, and nickel. High levels of persistent organic pollutants (POPS), byproducts of industrial processes, were present in eggs from free-range chickens. An egg tested by researchers was found to have 84 nanograms per kilogram of dioxins and furans, a level 33 times higher than the safety limit observed by the European Union.

Administration
The district is divided into 18 subdistricts (tambons), which are further subdivided into 116 villages (mubans). Samut Sakhon itself has city status (thesaban nakhon) and covers the three subdistricts Maha Chai, Tha Chalom, and Krokkrak. Bang Pla is a subdistrict municipality (thesaban tambon) which covers parts of the same-named subdistrict. Three other subdistricts completely form a subdistrict municipality: Na Di, Bang Ya Phraek and Tha Chin. The non-municipal area is administered by 12 tambon administrative organizations (TAO).

References

External links
amphoe.com(Thai)

Mueang Samut Sakhon